The name USS A-1 may refer to the following ships of the United States Navy:

 , the lead vessel of s
 USS A-1 (SP-1370), a houseboat taken over by the United States Navy in 1917

See also 
 A1 (disambiguation), for other ships named A1

United States Navy ship names